This is a list of notable people from Santa Cruz County, California. It includes people who were born/raised in, lived in, or spent portions of their lives in Santa Cruz, or for whom Santa Cruz is a significant part of their identity, as well as music groups founded in Santa Cruz. This list is in alphabetical order.

Notable people from Santa Cruz, California

Academia 
 Gerald M. Ackerman, art historian and professor
 Donna Haraway, feminist and professor
 David Haussler, computer scientist and professor
 David A. Huffman, computer scientist and professor
 Kevin Karplus, bioinformatician and professor

Activists 

 Bettina Aptheker, political activist, radical feminist, professor and author
 Susie Bright, feminist writer, sexuality expert
 Honey Lee Cottrell, lesbian and feminist activist, photographer and filmmaker, died in Santa Cruz
 Angela Davis, political activist, scholar, and writer
 Rory Calhoun, actor
 bell hooks, PhD from UCSC
 John Hoyt, actor
 Elissa Knight, actress
 Frank Lima (aka The Great Morgani), street performer, accordionist
 Camryn Manheim, actor

Actors and film production 
 ZaSu Pitts, actress
 Ruth Righi, actress, singer
 Adam Scott, actor
 Grant Show, actor
 Lex van den Berghe, Survivor contestant

Artists and designers 

 Cam Archer, filmmaker and photographer
 Bathsheba Grossman, sculptor
 Scott Kurtz, cartoonist
 Frans Lanting, wildlife photographer
 Edmund McMillen, video game designer
 Ed Penniman, artist
 Suzanne Scheuer, artist, New Deal-era murals

Crime 

 Edmund Kemper, serial killer
 Herbert Mullin, serial killer

Entrepreneurs 

 Elihu Anthony, businessman during the Gold Rush-era and a founding father of the city of Santa Cruz
 John Battendieri, businessman, founder Santa Cruz Organic
 James H. Clark, entrepreneur and computer scientist
 Julia Hartz, co-founder and CEO of Eventbrite
 Reed Hastings, founder of Netflix
 Philippe Kahn, creator of the camera-phone / cellphone-camera and mathematician
 Jack O'Neill, credited with developing first surfing wet suits
 Lorenzo "Larry" Ponza, inventor of the modern baseball pitching machine
 Fred Swanton, creator of what is now the Santa Cruz Beach Boardwalk

Musicians 
 Giovanni Amighetti, contemporary music composer (honorary citizen)
 Bob Brozman, guitarist and ethnomusicologist
 Cornelius Bumpus, saxophonist for bands Doobie Brothers and Steely Dan
 David Cope, composer
 Sasha Dobson, jazz singer
 James Durbin, singer and guitarist; American Idol finalist
 Remy and Pascal Le Boeuf, twin jazz musicians
 Tom Lehrer, musician and satirist
 Bob Lowery, blues singer and guitarist
 David Lowery, guitarist, Camper Van Beethoven and Cracker
 Chris Rene, musician, singer-songwriter
 Derek Sherinian, keyboardist for Alice Cooper, the band KISS, and the band Dream Theater
 Skip Spence, musician, singer-songwriter. Co-founder of Moby Grape.
 Gertrude Auld Thomas, opera singer and composer
 Ted Templeman, drummer for Harpers Bizarre
 Them Are Us Too, music duo which formed while both members (Cash Askew and Kennedy Ashlyn Wenning) were students at UC Santa Cruz
 Oliver Tree, musician
 Lu Watters, jazz trumpeter, founder of Yerba Buena Jazz Band
 Scott Weiland, vocalist for bands Stone Temple Pilots and Velvet Revolver
 Joy Williams, musician
 George Winston, pianist

Music bands

 Arsonists Get All The Girls (experimental deathcore)
 A Band of Orcs (death metal)
 Bassnectar (electronic/dubstep)
 Blackbird Raum (acoustic punk)
 Bl'ast  (punk)
 Brain Drill (technical death metal)
 The Call (rock)
 Camper Van Beethoven (alternative)
 The Chop Tops (rockabilly)
 Comets on Fire (psychedelic/noise/rock)
 Craig's Brother (punk)
 Decrepit Birth (death metal)
 Deth Specula (first live music concert broadcast over the Internet)
 The Devil Makes Three (folk/punk)
 Dirty Penny (Hard Rock/Glam Metal)
 The Ducks (rock)
 Estradasphere (experimental)
 The Expendables (reggae)
 Good Riddance (punk)
 The Holy Sisters of the Gaga Dada (pop rock)
 Minnesota (dubstep/EDM)
 Nuclear Whales Saxophone Orchestra
 Slow Gherkin (ska/punk)
 Sound Tribe Sector 9 (electronic/psychedelic rock)
 Spot 1019 (country blues punk rock)
 Swingin' Utters (punk)
 Harpers Bizarre (pop) 
 World Entertainment War (tribal funk)

Writers and poets 

 Ralph Abraham, mathematician
 Bettina Aptheker, feminist and author
 Ellen Bass, poet
 Peter S. Beagle, novelist
 Jennifer Otter Bickerdike, music writer and lecturer
 Rob Brezsny, astrologer, poet, writer, and musician
 Norman O. Brown, scholar, writer, and social philosopher
 Jonathan Franzen, novelist and essayist
 Laurie Garrett, American science journalist and author, UCSC graduate
 Steven Hassan, author, mental health expert and cult exit counselor
 Robert A. Heinlein, author of science fiction
 Dennis Holt, poet, linguist, and translator
 James D. Houston, novelist
 Jeanne Wakatsuki Houston, novelist
 Laurie R. King, novelist
 Noah Levine, author and Buddhist teacher
 Morton Marcus, poet, teacher
 Josephine Clifford McCracken, writer
 James Alan McPherson, essayist
 Liza Monroy, novelist, memoirist, essayist, and educator.
 Adrienne Rich, poet, writer, feminist
 William James Royce, playwright/director, screenwriter, and novelist
 Robert Sward, poet
 Robert Anton Wilson, author, novelist, essayist, editor, playwright, poet, futurist, and self-described agnostic mystic.

Scientists 

 Frank Drake, astrophysicist
 Sandra M. Faber, astrophysicist
 Alison Galloway, forensic anthropologist
 Jim Kent, bioinformatician
 Jerry Nelson, astronomer
 Ted Taylor, theoretical physicist with a focus on nuclear energy and disarmament advocate

Sports 
 Walmer Martinez, USL player
 Brendon Ayanbadejo, National Football League player and activist
 Haley Jones, basketball player
 Obafemi Ayanbadejo, NFL player and older brother of Brendon
 Trent Dilfer, National Football League player, ESPN sportscaster
 Reggie Stephens, professional football player for the New York Giants
 Nate Doss, professional disc golfer and three-time PDGA World Champion
 Lynden Gooch, professional soccer player for Sunderland A.F.C.
 Glenallen Hill, Major League Baseball player
 Johnny Johnson, NFL player
 Ernie Lombardi, Major League Baseball player
 Casey McGehee, Major League Baseball player
 Jay Moriarity, surfer
 Stephen Quadros, MMA play-by-play broadcaster 
 Luke Rockhold, mixed martial artist, former Strikeforce and UFC middleweight champion
 Chris Sharma, rock climber
Ken Westerfield, disc sports (Frisbee) pioneer, competitor, promoter

Other 

 Matt Mahurin, film director and photographer
 Marisa Miller, Sports Illustrated and Victoria's Secret model
 Nikki Silva, Peabody Award-winning radio producer
 Lorette Wood, first female city councilwoman and first female Mayor of Santa Cruz

Attended University of California, Santa Cruz

 Richard Bandler, author
 Jello Biafra, vocalist for the Dead Kennedys
 Adragon De Mello, child prodigy

 Cary Fukunaga, Emmy Award-winning film director
 Gus Hansen, professional poker player 
 Victor Davis Hanson, historian
 Miranda July, filmmaker, author, performance artist
 David Lowery, vocalist for Camper Van Beethoven and Cracker
 Camryn Manheim, actor
 Kent Nagano, conductor
 Huey P. Newton, activist and leader of the Black Panthers
 Bradley Nowell, lead singer and guitarist for Sublime
 Marti Noxon, television and film writer
 Norman Packard, chaos theory physicist
 Joe Palca, National Public Radio science reporter
 Dana Priest, Pulitzer Prize-winning journalist
 Jason Roberts, author 
 Rebecca Romijn, model and actor
 Maya Rudolph, actor
 Andy Samberg, writer and comedian
 Akiva Schaffer, Emmy Award-winning comedy writer
 Brenda Shaughnessy, poet
 Kathryn Dwyer Sullivan, astronaut
 Amy Tan, author
 Rubén Valtierra, keyboardist for Weird Al Yankovic, producer, composer 
 Ally Walker, actor 
 Gillian Welch, musician
 Rich Wilkes, director and screenwriter
 Susan Wojcicki, CEO of YouTube
 Ron Yerxa, film producer

See also

 List of people from Oakland, California
 List of people from San Francisco
 List of people from San Jose, California
 List of people from Palo Alto, California

References 

Santa Cruz
List
Santa Cruz